Roger Herschel Zion (September 17, 1921 – September 24, 2019) was an American World War II veteran and politician who served in the United States House of Representatives from Indiana from 1967 through 1975.

Biography 
Roger Zion was born in Escanaba, Michigan, in September 1921 and attended public schools in Milwaukee, Wisconsin, and Evansville, Indiana. He graduated from Benjamin Bosse High School and became an Eagle Scout in 1932. He received his Bachelor of Arts from the University of Wisconsin–Madison in 1943.

World War II 
He served in the United States Navy from 1943 to 1946, serving in the Asia-Pacific area during World War II, and was discharged a lieutenant.

Post-war career 
Zion attended Harvard Graduate School of Business Administration from 1944 to 1945. He became associated with Mead Johnson & Company, working for the company from 1946 through 1965; eventually becoming director of training and professional relations.

Congress 
At the suggestion of D. Mead Johnson, chief of Mead Johnson, he ran for Congress in 1964 as Republican but was unsuccessful losing to the incumbent Democrat Winfield K. Denton. However, running against Denton in the 1966 election, he unseated Denton. Beginning in the 90th Congress, he was re-elected to the three succeeding Congresses, serving from January 3, 1967, to January 3, 1975. In 1967, Zion called anti-Vietnam War protesters "traitors" and suggested that "any of them involved in illegal acts be treated comparably with Frenchmen whose heads were shaved if they were caught collaborating with the Germans in World War II." While in Congress and following his Congressional terms, he participated in various bridge tournaments against corporate executives including Warren Buffett and members of the British Parliament.

Zion was an unsuccessful candidate for reelection in 1974 to the 94th Congress, losing to state Senator Philip H. Hayes beginning a long line of frequent turnovers in the district known as the Bloody Eighth.

Later career and death 
After leaving Congress, Zion became the president of Resources Development Inc. in Washington, D.C. As of 2011 he resided in Washington, D.C., but later moved back to Evansville. 

He died in Evansville at the age of 98 in September 2019. He was survived by his wife of 74 years, Marjorie Emma Knauss, and three children.

See also
 List of members of the House Un-American Activities Committee

References

External links

1921 births
2019 deaths
American Congregationalists
United States Navy personnel of World War II
Harvard Business School alumni
Military personnel from Michigan
People from Escanaba, Michigan
Politicians from Evansville, Indiana
Politicians from Washington, D.C.
United States Navy officers
University of Wisconsin–Madison alumni
Republican Party members of the United States House of Representatives from Indiana
Members of Congress who became lobbyists